Lisa Rene Shanti Hanna (born August 20, 1975) is a Jamaican politician and beauty queen who was crowned Miss World 1993, becoming the third Jamaican to win the title. A member of the opposition People's National Party, Hanna currently serves as Member of Parliament for Saint Ann South East, and was Jamaica's Minister of Youth and Culture from 2012–2016. Hanna was a candidate in the 2020 People's National Party leadership election, following the PNP's defeat at the 2020 Jamaican general election and the subsequent resignation of PNP President and Opposition Leader, Peter Phillips. Hanna was defeated by Mark Golding.

Education
She was educated at the Queen's School, Jamaica, where she was appointed a Goodwill Ambassador by the United Nations Development Programme, and has a Bachelors and Masters degree in Communications from the University of the West Indies.

Professional life

Career in entertainment
In 1998, Hanna acted in the romantic comedy How Stella Got Her Groove Back. In 2003, Hanna tried her hand in broadcasting, hosting a Jamaican talk show Our Voices and was a guest presenter on Xtra in the United States. She returned to her country a year later and was a communications consultant for the Hilton Hotel in New Kingston.

Jamaican Parliament
In the 2007 general election, as a member of the People's National Party, Hanna contested and won the seat for St. Ann South East. Hence, positioning her as a Member of Parliament for that Constituency. She is one of the youngest women to be elected to the Jamaican Parliament. In addition to her duties as constituency representative she served as opposition spokesperson on Information, Youth and Culture up to December 2011. In the 29 December 2011 polls her party was elected into power. She was subsequently appointed as Minister of Youth and Culture. 

During her tenure as Minister of Youth & Culture, Hanna developed the Green Paper for the National Youth Policy 2015-2030. This policy aimed to address the needs of all young people through partnerships with the public sector, private sector, youth organizations, NGOs, faith-based organizations, academia and with Jamaica’s international development partners. 

Under Hanna’s ministry, the National Foster Care programme was revamped, allowing the placement of over 855 children with 800 families.  

Hanna’s ministry also bolstered the Ananda Alert System which allowed 85% of missing children to be returned safely to their homes in August 2013. 

In 2016, Hanna shared her strategy for tackling the needs of Jamaican children at a UNICEF conference in New York City. That same year, Jamaica moved up 52 places on the UNICEF Kids Rights Index to be ranked 51 out of 163 countries.  

In 2015, Hanna successfully lobbied to have Jamaica’s Blue and John Crow Mountain’s declared a UNESCO World Heritage Site. They became the first UNESCO World Heritage site for Jamaica and the Caribbean.   

On November 7, 2020 the PNP elected Mark Golding as its 6th President after he defeated challenger Hanna by 1,740 votes to 1,444 in the 2020 People's National Party leadership election. 

In 2021, Hanna became a weekly columnist for the Jamaica Observer, where she opined on an array of topics, from the value-added opportunities of Jamaican Agriculture to her desire to see Bob Marley named National Hero.    

In March 2022, Hanna was appointed to APCO Worldwide’s International Advisory Council (IAC). Her role is to expand the Caribbean and Latin American focus in the areas of food security, trade, global economy and matters concerning gender and the security related to gender.

Personal life
Lisa Hanna was born in Retreat, St. Mary Parish to Rene Hanna of Lebanese descent and Dorothy Hosang of African and Chinese descent. Hanna married David Panton in 1999 in New York City.  Hanna and Panton had a son in 2001.  They divorced in 2004 in Atlanta. In December 2017, Hanna married Jamaican businessman Richard Lake in St. Andrew, Jamaica. Together Richard Lake and Lisa Hanna run Lydford Logistics a contract manufacturing, commercial warehouse and shipping operation in Moneague, Jamaica.

See also
 Women in the House of Representatives of Jamaica

References

External links
People's National Party - Official Lisa Hanna profile
Lydford Logistics: About Us  

1975 births
Living people
University of the West Indies alumni
Communications consultants
Government ministers of Jamaica
Jamaican beauty pageant winners
Jamaican female models
Jamaican columnists
Jamaican women columnists
Jamaican people of Lebanese descent
Members of the House of Representatives of Jamaica
Miss World winners
Miss World 1993 delegates
People from Kingston, Jamaica
People's National Party (Jamaica) politicians
Women government ministers of Jamaica
21st-century Jamaican women politicians
21st-century Jamaican politicians
Beauty queen-politicians
Members of the 11th Parliament of Jamaica
Members of the 12th Parliament of Jamaica
Members of the 13th Parliament of Jamaica
Members of the 14th Parliament of Jamaica